LUMA Foundation is a nonprofit organization established in 2004 that is based out of Zurich, Switzerland. It supports the activities of independent contemporary artists and other pioneers working in the fields of art, photography, publishing, documentary, and multimedia.

History
Established by Maja Hoffmann, the foundation promotes artistic projects combining a particular interest in environmental issues, human rights, education, and culture in the broadest sense.

Programs
In 2011, the LUMA Foundation launched an acquisition program of books and films for its future library and hosted a symposium in Arles entitled The Human Snapshot, which brought together a number of leading thinkers to discuss the photographic image and its impact on human rights.

The LUMA Foundation's focus is to create an experimental cultural complex, the Parc des Ateliers in Arles, France, dedicated to the production of exhibitions and ideas and developed with architect Frank Gehry. This project envisions an interdisciplinary center for the production of art exhibitions, research, education and archives.

POOL is an innovative program that combines the collaboration of an international group of private collectors with a mentor-based training programme for art curators. The programme has been conceived by Beatrix Ruf, (Director and Curator, Kunsthalle Zürich 2001-2014) in collaboration with the founding collectors Maja Hoffmann and Michael Ringier.

LUMA Arles

Program
LUMA Arles, which launched formally in 2013, is dedicated to providing artists with opportunities to experiment in the production of new work through interdisciplinary collaboration. The conceptualisation of its mission, and the initial programming, has been spearheaded by Maja Hoffmann. It is an institution dedicated to providing artists with opportunities to experiment in the production and presentation of new work in close collaboration with other artists, curators, scientists, innovators and audiences. The opening programme in 2021 included work by 45 artists and designers and special new commissions for LUMA by international artists, such as Etel Adnan, Ólafur Elíasson, Koo Jeong A, Kapwani Kiwanga, Helen Marten, Pierre Huyghe, Carsten Höller, Philippe Parreno and Rirkrit Tiravanija.

LUMA Arles works in collaboration with Actes Sud, a major French publishing house known for its work in the arts, humanities, and for children, and the École Nationale Supérieure de la Photographie, the first post-graduate program to specialise in photography in France. Every summer, LUMA Arles hosts installations and programs for the international photography festival, Rencontres d’Arles.

LUMA Days is LUMA Arles’ yearly forum of art and ideas where local and international experts, scientists, artists, thinkers, and activists converge with the general public to share ideas and experiences around topical issues. It attempts to bring together all the elements that compose the LUMA program with a week of public events, conferences, professional workshops, displays, and art installations. Each year, LUMA Days considers a socially impactful theme linked to the preoccupations of the LUMA foundation.

Architecture
Sitting just outside Arles’s Roman city walls, the centrepiece of the 27-acre LUMA Arles campus is the  Arts Resource Centre building designed by Frank Gehry. It houses research and reference facilities, workshop and seminar rooms, and artist studios and presentation spaces. Gehry’s initial design for two metallic towers met with considerable opposition and was subsequently rejected by France’s National Commission of Historical Monuments, on the grounds that the buildings would obscure views of the Alyscamps. In 2013, a second design in a different position on the north of the site—a single twisting tower with 13 levels and 11,000 reflective stainless-steel plates—was approved.

LUMA Arles also encompasses six historic, large-scale industrial buildings. One historic building, the Grande Halle, was renovated in 2007 by the initiative of the Provence-Alpes-Côte d’Azur region. Four other large-scale industrial buildings on the Luma Arles site, previously a manufacture and repair yard for the French national railway system, were refurbished by Annabelle Selldorf and are used for installations and artists’ residencies.

Collaborators
The Foundation engages in long-term collaborations with institutions like the New Museum of Contemporary Art (New York), CCS Bard College (Annandale-on-Hudson, New York), Serpentine Gallery and Tate Modern (London), the Kunsthalle Zürich and the Fotomuseum Winterthur (Switzerland). LUMA is a partner of Les Rencontres d’Arles Photographie Awards in Arles.

References

External links
  LUMA Foundation video documentation
  LUMA Foundation

Arts foundations based in Switzerland
Contemporary art organizations